Jacob Hugo Une Larsson (born 8 April 1994) is a Swedish professional footballer who plays as a defender for Greek Super League club Panetolikos, on loan from Djurgårdens IF.

Club career
After breaking into the first team at the end of the 2012 Superettan season where IF Brommapojkarna were promoted he established himself as a starting central defender for the team the following year in Swedish top tier Allsvenskan. At only 20 years of age he took over the role as team captain in 2014 after previous captain Pontus Segerström died. The club was relegated back down to Superettan at the end of the season.

Djurgårdens IF
In July 2015, it was confirmed that Une Larsson would join Allsvenskan club Djurgårdens IF on a three-year contract starting in 2016. Une Larsson admitted that he chose Djurgården over Norwegian powerhouse Rosenborg BK. When the signing was announced he declared that he was a Djurgården supporter in "heart and soul", a statement which angered fans of Brommapojkarna since he had four months remaining of his contract with the club and also had been playing for Brommapojkarna his whole career. On 2 October 2016 Une Larsson scored his first goal for Djurgården with a header in the 3–2 win against Örebro SK. On 10 May 2018, he scored as Djurgården beat Malmö FF 3–0 in the Swedish Cup Final.

International career
Une Larsson has represented the Sweden national under-17 football team, Sweden national under-19 football team and Sweden national under-21 football team. Une Larsson was selected in the Swedish Olympic squad for the 2016 Summer Olympics in Rio de Janeiro, Brazil. He played and scored in the friendly game ahead of the Olympic games and played two games in the tournament.

Career statistics

International
''As of 2020.

Honours
Djurgårdens IF
 Allsvenskan: 2019
 Svenska Cupen: 2017–18

References

External links

Djurgården official website profile

1994 births
Living people
Association football defenders
Swedish footballers
Swedish expatriate footballers
Sweden youth international footballers
Sweden under-21 international footballers
Allsvenskan players
Superettan players
Super League Greece players
IF Brommapojkarna players
Djurgårdens IF Fotboll players
Panetolikos F.C. players
Swedish expatriate sportspeople in Greece
Expatriate footballers in Greece
Footballers at the 2016 Summer Olympics
Olympic footballers of Sweden
Footballers from Stockholm